Gerlache Strait or de Gerlache Strait or Détroit de la Belgica is a channel/strait separating the Palmer Archipelago from the Antarctic Peninsula. The Belgian Antarctic Expedition, under Lt. Adrien de Gerlache, explored the strait in January and February 1898, naming it for the expedition ship Belgica. The name was later changed to honor the commander himself.

On the expedition in the Gerlache Strait, biologist Emil Racoviță made several discoveries, including a flightless midge fly that was later formally named Belgica antarctica by the Belgian entomologist Jean-Charles Jacobs.

Geology
Four tectonic blocks are identifiable in the Gerlache Strait area, bounded by two systems of Tertiary strike-slip faults. The longitudinal faults include the SW-NE trending Neumayer Fault that extends from Peltier Channel across Wiencke Island, and then onwards most likely as the Gerlache Fault.  The SW-NE trending Fournier Fault parallels the Gerlache Fault and divides Anvers Island.  The transverse faults trend E-W and SE-NW across Wiencke Island and Brabant Island, and include the Schollaert Channel faults.  The Danco Coast Block extends from Cape Willems to Wilhelmina Bay.  The Brabant Island Block encompasses the southern portion of that island.  The Neumayer Channel Block is bound by the Neumayer Fault and the Fournier Fault.  The Anvers-Melchior Islands Block includes northwest Anvers Island and its offshore islands Melchior Islands.

Gerlache Straight can be viewed from Spigot Peak.

History 
In 1934, polar explorer Lincoln Ellsworth reported in the New York Times that a heavy snowstorm and ice made it necessary to change his plan for going from De Gerlache Strait out to sea and south to Adelaide Island.

In 1979, four American adventurers survived a two-month expedition to Antarctica. The Washington Post reported that the most dangerous part of their journey was a their crossing of the Gerlache Straight on a raft.

The writer Dianne Ackerman said she went to Gerlache Strait in the 1990s in order to find inspiration for writing prose.

In 2002, Lynne Cox became the first person to swim a mile in the near-freezing Antarctic Ocean. She did the swim in Gerlache Strait.

In 2021, a couple on a ship in the Gerlache Straight captured footage of a gentoo penguin narrowly escaping a few hungry killer whales.

Gallery

References

External links

Straits of the Palmer Archipelago